Graphium doson, the common jay, is a black, tropical papilionid (swallowtail) butterfly with pale blue semi-transparent central wing bands that are formed by large spots. There is a marginal series of smaller spots. The underside of wings is brown with markings similar to upperside but whitish in colour. The sexes look alike. The species was first described by father and son entomologists Cajetan and Rudolf Felder.

Range
It is widespread and common throughout Southeast Asia, including lower elevations in Sri Lanka and southern India, Eastern Ghats, Satpuras, Bengal, Assam and Bangladesh, and the Himalayan foothills. The species is however scarce in southern Honshū, Japan.

Subspecies
G. d. axion (C. & R. Felder, 1864)   North India - China, Hainan, Indo-China, Burma, Thailand
G. d. doson Ceylon
G. d. eurypylides (Staudinger, 1895)   Lombok, Sumbawa
G. d. evemonides (Honrath, 1884)   Peninsular Malaya, Sumatra, Java - Borneo, Philippines
G. d. gyndes (Fruhstorfer, 1907)   Philippines (Palawan, Busuanga, Dumaran)
G. d. gelap Page  and Treadaway, 2011
G. d. kajanga (Corbet, 1937)   Pulau Tioman
G. d. mikado (Leech, 1887)   Japan
G. d. nauta Tsukada & Nishiyama, 1980   Philippines 
G. d. perillus (Fruhstorfer, 1908)  
G. d. postianus (Fruhstorfer, 1902)   Taiwan, Philippines (Batanes)
G. d. rubroplaga (Rothschild, 1895)   Nias
G. d. robinson  Monastyrskii, 2012   South Vietnam, Con Son Island
G. d. sankapura (Fruhstorfer, 1904)   Bawean

Habitat
It is common in thick, riparian, moist, deciduous, semi-evergreen and evergreen forests.

Behaviour
The common jay is active throughout the day and constantly on the move; it rarely settles down. Its flight is swift and straight. When feeding from flowers, it never settles down and keeps its wings vibrating. The males are seen mud-puddling, often in tight groups.

Life cycle

Eggs
The spherical and pale yellow eggs are laid singly on the underside of leaves.

Larva
The caterpillar is somewhat spindle shaped. The grown caterpillars have two forms, dark brown or grassy green. There are spines on the fourth segment which are short, conical and blue centred surrounded by lemon yellow and then black rings. The osmeterium is pale bluish green. It is extruded only reluctantly.

Pupa
The pupa is pale green with a dark purplish median line from the head to the thoracic horn and a yellow line from the tip of the horn to the cremaster.

Images of life cycle

Food plants
The caterpillars feed on plants of the families Annonaceae, Lauraceae and Magnoliaceae such as Annona lawii, Annona muricata, Cinnamomum macrocarpum, Cinnamomum malabatrum, Magnolia grandiflora, Magnolia liliifera, Magnolia oblonga, Hunteria zeylanica, Michelia champaca, Trachelospermum asiaticum and Polyalthia longifolia.

Gallery

See also

List of butterflies of India
Papilionidae

References

 
 
 

doson
Insects of Pakistan
Butterflies of Asia
Natural monuments of Japan
Butterflies described in 1864
Butterflies of Singapore
Butterflies of Indochina
Taxa named by Baron Cajetan von Felder
Taxa named by Rudolf Felder